Yeoman (F) was an enlisted rate for women in the U.S. Naval Reserve during World War I. The first Yeoman (F) was Loretta Perfectus Walsh. At the time, the women were popularly referred to as "yeomanettes" or even "yeowomen", although the official designation was Yeoman (F).

The U.S. Naval Reserve Act of 1916 permitted the enlistment of qualified "persons" for service; Secretary of the Navy Josephus Daniels asked, "Is there any law that says a Yeoman must be a man?" and was told there was not. He began enlisting females as Yeoman (F), and in less than a month the Navy officially swore in the first female sailor in U.S. history.

Typically, female Yeoman reservists performed clerical duties such as typing, stenography, bookkeeping, accounting, inventory control, and telephone operation. A few became radio operators, electricians, draftsmen, pharmacists, photographers, telegraphers, fingerprint experts, chemists, torpedo assemblers and camouflage designers. Female Yeomen did not attend boot camp. A large number were stationed in Washington, D.C., while others served in naval stations, hospitals, shipyards and munitions factories around the country. Many recruiting stations employed the women who volunteered there as very effective recruiters, and as many as forty women served in England, France, Puerto Rico, the Virgin Islands, the Canal Zone, Guam, and the Territory of Hawaii.

Without new technologies, the Navy would never have had enough jobs to employ 11,274 female Yeomen. Also, having women in uniform was a positive image for the Navy to project. As well as their many military duties, the women were taught to march and drill at public rallies, recruiting campaigns, war bond drives, and troop send-offs.

The military's first enlisted women

Women had served in the United States military before World War I. In 1901, a female Nurse Corps was established in the Army Medical Department, and in 1908 a Navy Nurse Corps was established. However, despite their uniforms the nurses were civilian employees with few benefits. They slowly gained additional privileges, including "relative ranks" and insignia in 1920, a retirement pension in 1926, and a disability pension if injured in the line of duty in 1926. Edith Nourse Rogers, one of the first women to serve in Congress, voted to support the pensions.

The first American women enlisted into the regular armed forces were 13,000 women admitted into active duty in the Navy and Marines during World War I, and a much smaller number admitted into the Coast Guard. The Yeoman (F) recruits and women Marines primarily served in clerical positions. They received the same benefits and responsibilities as men, including identical pay (US$28.75 per month), and were treated as veterans after the war. These women were quickly demobilized when hostilities ceased, and aside from the Nurse Corps, the soldiery became once again exclusively male.

Some black women served as Yeomen (F) and were the first black women to serve as enlisted members of the U.S. armed forces. These first black women to serve in the United States Navy were 16 Yeomen (F)—the total would rise to 24—from some of "Washington's elite black families" who "worked in the Muster Roll division at Washington's Navy Yard...."

Uniforms
Two uniforms were prescribed for women in the USNRF. A winter uniform of navy blue serge alternated with a summer uniform of white drill. Both consisted of a single-breasted Norfolk style coat with gilt buttons and a rating badge on the left sleeve, worn over a skirt of the same fabric and shirt waist. The coat had patch pockets on each hip and a belt. The skirt was hemmed to four inches above the ankle, and the shirt waist was designed to be worn either open at the neck or buttoned. Hats were to be flat-brimmed sailor hats of navy blue felt or straw. Shoes, hose, gloves and a standard Navy neckerchief completed the outfit. Capes were also prescribed for cold weather.

Bids on the contract for the new uniforms closed on June 18, 1917. The first woman, Loretta Perfectus Walsh, had enlisted in March 1917, with no uniform specified, so various uniforms had been devised from interpretations of existing men's uniforms. Local adaptations were also made to accommodate those working in non-clerical jobs.

Post-World War I

Initially offered general discharges, the women veterans successfully lobbied for honorable discharges in recognition of their service. Many continued in government service as civilians. Women veterans joined the newly created American Legion in large numbers, forming posts that were all female or overwhelmingly female in larger cities or joining "mixed" units in other areas. The first all-woman American Legion post was formed in Boston, Massachusetts, with Daisy May Pratt Erd as its first commander.

The last surviving Yeoman (F) was Yeoman Second Class (F) Charlotte Winters, who died on March 27, 2007, in Boonsboro, Maryland.

See also
 Edith Nourse Rogers
 Joy Bright Hancock
 History of the United States Navy
 History of women in the military
 Women in the United States Navy

References

Further reading

I Was a Yeoman (F) - Mrs. Henry F. Butler (née Estelle Kemper) recounts her time as a Yeoman (F) during World War I.
The Yeoman (F) from The Mariners' Museum: Women & The Sea
Yeoman (F) uniform from Americans at War exhibition, the Smithsonian's National Museum of American History.
The Story of the Female Yeomen during the First World War by Nathaniel Patch. Patch also discusses research into individual Yeomen (F) using the National Archives.
Last Known Yeoman (F) Laid To Rest  (Charlotte Louise Berry Winters), 30 March 2007
World War I: Yeomen (F) from the Women In Military Service For America Memorial website
The End of an Era: The Last Surviving World War I Woman Veteran Dies  - article from the Women In Military Service For America Memorial
The Golden Fourteen, Plus - Richard E. Miller reports on the service of as many as thirty black women in the USNRF in World War I
World War I Yeoman (F) Uniform

External links
Women & the U.S. Navy -- World War I era Yeomen (F)
Photos and where they originated
JWA - Navy—Navy Nurse Corps
War I.html Women WWI
The Golden Fourteen a history by Richard E. Miller, including pictures, of the Black Yeomen (F)

Women in the United States Navy